is a 2012 Japanese film directed by Yūichi Fukuda. It is based on the Japanese television drama series of the same name.

Cast
Aya Hirano
Rino Sashihara as Maki
Nako Mizusawa
Narushi Ikeda
Moe Arai

References

External links

Films based on television series
2012 films
Films directed by Yūichi Fukuda
2010s Japanese films

ja:ミューズの鏡#映画